Soapstone (also known as steatite or soaprock) is a talc-schist, which is a type of metamorphic rock.  It is composed largely of the magnesium rich mineral talc.  It is produced by dynamothermal metamorphism and metasomatism, which occur in the zones where tectonic plates are subducted, changing rocks by heat and pressure, with influx of fluids, but without melting. It has been a medium for carving for thousands of years.

Terminology 
The definitions of the terms "steatite" and "soapstone" vary with the field of study. In geology, steatite is a rock that is to a very large extent composed of talc. The mining industry will define steatite as a high-purity talc rock that is suitable for manufacturing of, for example, insulators, the lesser grades of the mineral can be called simply "talc rock". Steatite can be used both in lumps ("block steatite", "lava steatite", "lava grade talc"), and in the ground form. While the geologists logically will use "steatite" to designate both forms, in the industry "steatite" without additional qualifications typically means the steatite that is either already ground or the one to be utilized in the ground form in the future. If the ground steatite is pressed together into blocks, these are called "synthetic block steatite", "artificial block steatite", "artificial lava talc".  

In industrial applications soapstone refers to dimension stone that consists of either amphibole-chlorite-carbonate-talc rock, talc-carbonate rock, or simply talc rock and is sold in the form of sawed slabs. "Ground soapstone" sometimes designates the ground waste product of the slab manufacturing.

Petrology

Petrologically, soapstone is composed dominantly of talc, with varying amounts of chlorite and amphiboles (typically tremolite, anthophyllite, and cummingtonite, hence its obsolete name, magnesiocummingtonite), and traces of minor iron-chromium oxides.  It may be schistose or massive.  Soapstone is formed by the metamorphism of ultramafic protoliths (e.g. dunite or serpentinite) and the metasomatism of siliceous dolomites.

By mass, "pure" steatite is roughly 63.37% silica, 31.88% magnesia, and 4.74% water. It commonly contains minor quantities of other oxides such as CaO or Al2O3.

Pyrophyllite, a mineral very similar to talc, is sometimes called soapstone in the generic sense, since its physical characteristics and industrial uses are similar, and because it is also commonly used as a carving material. However, this mineral typically does not have such a soapy feel as soapstone.

Physical characteristics

Soapstone is relatively soft because of its high talc content, talc having a definitional value of 1 on the Mohs hardness scale. Softer grades may feel similar to soap when touched, hence the name. No fixed hardness is given for soapstone because the amount of talc it contains varies widely, from as little as 30% for architectural grades such as those used on countertops, to as much as 80% for carving grades.

Soapstone is easy to carve; it is also durable, heat-resistant and has a high heat storage capacity. It has therefore been used for cooking and heating equipment for thousands of years.

Soapstone is often used as an insulator for housing and electrical components, due to its durability and electrical characteristics and because it can be pressed into complex shapes before firing. Soapstone undergoes transformations when heated to temperatures of  into enstatite and cristobalite; on the Mohs scale, this corresponds to an increase in hardness to 5.5–6.5. The resulting material, harder than glass, is sometimes called "lava".

Historical usage

Africa 
Ancient Egyptian scarab signets and amulets were most commonly made from glazed steatite. The Yoruba people of West Nigeria used soapstone for several statues, most notably at Esie, where archaeologists have uncovered hundreds of male and female statues about half of life size. The Yoruba of Ife also produced a miniature soapstone obelisk with metal studs called "the staff of Oranmiyan".

Americas 
Native Americans have used soapstone since the Late Archaic Period. During the Archaic archaeological period (8000-1000 BC), bowls, cooking slabs, and other objects were made from soapstone. Use of soapstone in native American cultures continue to the modern day. Later, other cultures carved soapstone smoking pipes, a practice that continues today. The soapstone's low heat conduction allows for prolonged smoking without the pipe heating up uncomfortably.

Indigenous peoples of the Arctic have traditionally used soapstone for carvings of both practical objects and art. The qulliq, a type of oil lamp, is carved out of soapstone and used by the Inuit, Chukchi, and Yupik peoples. This kind of lamp was the single most important article of furniture for the Inuit in their dwellings.

In the modern period, soapstone is commonly used for carvings in Inuit art.

In the United States, locally quarried soapstone was used for gravemarkers in 19th century northeast Georgia, around Dahlonega, and Cleveland as simple field stone and "slot and tab" tombs. Small blocks of soapstone (8" x 10" x 1") were also heated on the cookstove or near the fire and used to warm cold bedclothes or to keep hands and feet cozy while sleighing.

Asia 

The ancient trading city of Tepe Yahya in southeastern Iran was a center for the production and distribution of soapstone in the 5th to 3rd millennia BC.

Soapstone has been used in India as a medium for sculptures since at least the time of the Hoysala Empire, the Western Chalukya Empire and to an extent Vijayanagara Empire. Even earlier, steatite was used as the substrate for Indus-Harappan seals.  After carving, the seals were heated above  for several days to make them hard and durable to make the final seals used for making impressions on clay.

In China, during the Spring and Autumn Period (771–476 BC), soapstone was carved into ceremonial knives. Soapstone was also used to carve Chinese seals.

Soapstone was used as a writing pencil in Myanmar as early as the 11th century Pagan period.After that, it was still used as a pencil to write on Black Parabaik until the end of the Mandalay period (19th century).

Australia 
Pipes and decorative carvings of local animals were made out of soapstone by Australian Aboriginal artist Erlikilyika  (c.1865–c.1930) in Central Australia.

Europe 
The Minoan civilization on Crete used soapstone. At the Palace of Knossos, a steatite libation table was found. Soapstone is relatively abundant in northern Europe. Vikings hewed soapstone directly from the stone face, shaped it into cooking pots, and sold these at home and abroad. In Shetland, there is evidence these vessels were used for processing marine and dairy fats. Several surviving medieval buildings in northern Europe are constructed with soapstone, amongst them Nidaros Cathedral.

Modern usage 

In modern times, soapstone is most commonly used for architectural applications, such as counter tops, floor tiles, showerbases, and interior surfacing.

Soapstone is sometimes used for construction of fireplace surrounds, cladding on wood-burning stoves, and as the preferred material for woodburning masonry heaters because it can absorb, store, and evenly radiate heat due to its high density and magnesite (MgCO3) content. It is also used for countertops and bathroom tiling because of the ease of working the material and its property as the "quiet stone".  A weathered or aged appearance occurs naturally over time as the patina is enhanced.

Soapstone can be used to create molds for casting objects from soft metals, such as pewter or silver. The soft stone is easily carved and is not degraded by heating.  The slick surface of soapstone allows the finished object to be easily removed.

Welders and fabricators use soapstone as a marker due to its resistance to heat; it remains visible when heat is applied. It has also been used for many years by seamstresses, carpenters, and other craftspeople as a marking tool, because its marks are visible but not permanent.

Resistance to heat made steatite suitable for manufacturing gas burner tips, spark plugs, electrical switchboards.

Ceramics 
Steatite ceramics are low-cost biaxial porcelains of nominal composition (MgO)3(SiO2)4. Steatite is used primarily for its dielectric and thermal insulating properties in applications such as tile, substrates, washers, bushings, beads, and pigments. It is also used for high-voltage insulators, which have to stand large mechanical loads, e.g. insulators of mast radiators.

Crafts 
Soapstone continues to be used for carvings and sculptures by artists and indigenous peoples. In Brazil, especially in the state of Minas Gerais, the abundance of soapstone mines allow local artisans to craft pots, pans, wine glasses, statues, jewel boxes, coasters, and vases from soapstone. These handicrafts are commonly sold in street markets found in cities across the state. Some of the oldest towns, notably Congonhas, Tiradentes, and Ouro Preto, still have some of their streets paved with soapstone from colonial times.

Mining 
Architectural soapstone is mined in Canada, Brazil, India, and Finland and imported into the United States. Active North American mines include one south of Quebec City with products marketed by Canadian Soapstone, the Treasure and Regal mines in Beaverhead County, Montana mined by the Barretts Minerals Company, and another in Central Virginia operated by the Alberene Soapstone Company.

Mining to meet worldwide demand for soapstone is threatening the habitat of India's tigers.

Other 
Soapstones can be put in a freezer and later used in place of ice cubes to chill alcoholic beverages without diluting. Sometimes called whiskey stones, these were first introduced around 2007. Most whiskey stones feature a semipolished finish, retaining the soft look of natural soapstone, while others are highly polished.

Safety 
People can be exposed to soapstone dust in the workplace via inhalation and skin or eye contact. Exposure above safe limits can lead to symptoms including coughing, shortness of breath, cyanosis, crackles, and pulmonary heart disease.

United States
The Occupational Safety and Health Administration  has set the legal limit (permissible exposure limit) for soapstone exposure in the workplace as 20 million particles per cubic foot over an 8-hour workday. The National Institute for Occupational Safety and Health has set a recommended exposure limit of 6 mg/m3 total exposure and 3 mg/m3 respiratory exposure over an 8-hour workday. At levels of 3000 mg/m3, soapstone is immediately dangerous to life and health.

Other names
The local names for the soapstone vary: in Vermont,  "grit" is used, in Georgia "white-grinding" and "dark-grinding" varieties are distinguished, California has "soft", "hard", and "blue" talc.
Also:
 Combarbalite stone, exclusively mined in Combarbalá, Chile, is known for its many colors.  While they are not visible during mining, they appear after refining.
 Palewa and gorara stones are types of Indian soapstone.
 A variety of other regional and marketing names for soapstone are used.

Gallery

See also
 List of minerals
 List of rocks
 Talc carbonate
 Archeological Site 38CK1, Archeological Site 38CK44, and Archeological Site 38CK45

References

Sources

Further reading
Felce, Robert (2011) Soaprock Coast... The origins of English porcelain

External links

 Soapstone Calculated Refractory Data w/ Technical Properties Converter (Incl. Soapstone Volume vs. Weight measuring units)
 Ancient soapstone bowl (The Central States Archaeological Journal)
 Soapstone Native American quarries, Maryland (Geological Society of America)
 Prehistoric soapstone use in northeastern Maryland (Antiquity Journal)
 The Blue Rock Soapstone Quarry, Yancey County, NC (North Carolina Office of State Archaeology)
 CDC - NIOSH Pocket Guide to Chemical Hazards
 Steatite historical marker in Decatur, Georgia

Dielectrics
Metamorphic rocks
Phyllosilicates
Sculpture materials
Stone (material)
Petrology
Ceramic materials